Marc Le Fur (born 28 November 1956) is a French politician who has represented the 3rd constituency of the Côtes-d'Armor department in the National Assembly since 2002. A member of The Republicans (LR), he previously held the seat from 1993 to 1997.

Political career
Marc Le Fur has been a member of the Regional Council of Brittany since 2015, where he previously held a seat from 1998 to 2004. He also held a seat in the General Council of Côtes-d'Armor from 2001 to 2015 for the canton of Quintin.

In Parliament, Le Fur serves on the Finance Committee. Additionally, he held one of the six vice presidencies of the National Assembly (2007–2012; 2012–2017; 2017–2022) until the end of the 15th legislature of the Fifth Republic; as such he was part of the National Assembly's Bureau. 

In addition to his committee assignments, Le Fur is a member of the French-Nigerian Parliamentary Friendship Group and the French-Ukrainian Parliamentary Friendship Group.

Political positions
Le Fur has actively promoted the defence of the regional languages of France. He was an important contributor to the French constitutional law of 23 July 2008 that amended the Constitution of France to recognise regional languages as part of France's national heritage in Article 75-1.

He has been a supporter of the attempts to have the Loire-Atlantique department transferred from the Pays de la Loire region to Brittany.

In April 2013, Le Fur was part of a demonstration in Paris against the legalisation of same-sex marriage in France. A video was shared of him trying to physically hold back National Gendarmerie personnel as they were attempting to remove protestors who were sat on the ground. After he failed, Le Fur knocked the hat off a gendarme's head. He later stated he stayed until late in the night wearing his official sash to be recognisable as a Member of Parliament alongside other demonstrators to avoid the demonstration being the target of police violence. Later that month, he was sanctioned in the National Assembly along with Yves Albarello and Daniel Fasquelle for their behaviour in Parliament.

In November 2013, Le Fur also took part in a Bonnets Rouges demonstration in Quimper against a proposed ecotax.

In The Republicans' 2017 leadership election, Le Fur endorsed Laurent Wauquiez for the party leadership. Ahead of the 2022 presidential election, he publicly declared his support for Michel Barnier as The Republicans' candidate.

References

1956 births
Living people
Sciences Po alumni
École nationale d'administration alumni
Rally for the Republic politicians
Union for a Popular Movement politicians
The Republicans (France) politicians
People from Côtes-d'Armor
Politicians from Brittany
Departmental councillors (France)
Members of the Regional Council of Brittany
Deputies of the 10th National Assembly of the French Fifth Republic
Deputies of the 12th National Assembly of the French Fifth Republic
Deputies of the 13th National Assembly of the French Fifth Republic
Deputies of the 14th National Assembly of the French Fifth Republic
Deputies of the 15th National Assembly of the French Fifth Republic
Deputies of the 16th National Assembly of the French Fifth Republic